Christchurch is a town and former borough in the county of Dorset on the English Channel coast, adjoining Bournemouth in the west, with the New Forest to the east. Historically in Hampshire, it joined Dorset with the reorganisation of local government in 1974 and is the most easterly borough in the county. Its close proximity to the Cotentin Peninsula made it an important trading port and a potential target for invasion during the Napoleonic and Second World Wars.

The borough has over 300 nationally listed buildings and structures, a sample of which are described below, and more than 200 locally listed.

In England, a building or structure is defined as "listed" when it is placed on a statutory register of buildings of "special architectural or historic interest" by the Secretary of State for Culture, Media and Sport, a Government department, in accordance with the Planning (Listed Buildings and Conservation Areas) Act 1990.  English Heritage, a non-departmental public body, acts as an agency of this department to administer the process and advise the department on relevant issues.  There are three grades of listing status: Grade I, defined as being of "exceptional interest"; Grade II*, "particularly important buildings of more than special interest"; and Grade II, used for buildings of "special interest".

Christchurch has seven structures of Grade I status, 12 listed at Grade II* and 316 of Grade II status.
Three of the Grade I structures are bridges, one a church, one a Gothic mansion, one a Norman dwelling and one a Norman castle. Other structures given recognition by English Heritage include a Victorian pillar box, a 1935 telephone kiosk, a bandstand, a mausoleum (see below), a drinking fountain (see below), two entire graveyards, and two war memorials.

In addition the borough has 12 scheduled ancient monuments, three nationally important archaeological sites, 12 conservation areas and four sites of special scientific interest (SSSI). For more information on these, see the main articles Christchurch, Dorset, Stanpit Marsh and Christchurch Harbour.

Listed buildings

Listed buildings not featured in the main article

Grade II* 
The gates and railings of the Priory churchyard, Church Street, Christchurch. DoE Reference: 1A/123 Grid Reference: .
Greystones, Waterford Road, Highcliffe. DoE Reference: 13/60. Grid Reference: .
The Moorings, Bure Lane, Mudeford. DoE Reference: 3/40. Grid Reference: .
Hurn Court, Hurn Court Lane, Hurn. DoE Reference: 8/350. Grid Reference: .

Grade II 
Tole Cottage, Avon Causeway, Sopley. DoE ref 8/335. Grid Reference: .
Nos 1 & 2 Riverside Cottages plus adjoining building, Avon Causeway, Hurn. DoE ref 8/339. Grid Reference: .
No 21 Bargates, Christchurch. DoE ref 1A/72. Grid Reference: .
No 22 Bargates, Christchurch. DoE ref 1A/67 4/67. Grid Reference: .
No 24 Bargates, Christchurch. DoE ref 4/249.Grid Reference: 
(The old) Iford Bridge, Barrack Road, Christchurch. DoE ref 5/48. Grid Reference: .
No 20 Barrack Road, Christchurch. DoE ref 1/46. Grid Reference: .
Cottage at Bockhampton farm, Bockhampton Road, Middle Bockhampton. DoE ref 9/398. Grid Reference: .
 The pump south of cottage, Bockhampton Road, Middle Bockhampton. DoE ref 9/397. Grid Reference: .
Farmhouse at Bockhampton, Bockhampton Road, Middle Bockhampton. DoE ref 9/399. Grid Reference: .
The Granary at Bockhampton, Bockhampton Road, Middle Bockhampton. DoE ref 9/396. Grid Reference: .
The North Barn at Bockhampton farm, Bockhampton Road, Middle Bockhampton. DoE ref 9/400. Grid Reference: .
The South Barn at Bockhampton farm, Bockhampton Road, Middle Bockhampton. DoE ref 9/395. Grid Reference: .
The farmhouse at Fir Grove Farm, Boundary Lane, Hurn. DoE ref 10/401. Grid Reference: SU1066000166.
No 30 Bridge Street, Christchurch. DoE ref 1A/162. Grid Reference: .
No 10 Bridge Street, Christchurch. DoE ref 1A/435. Grid Reference: .
No 18 Bridge Street, Christchurch. DoE ref 1A/160. Grid Reference: .
No 2 Bridge Street, Christchurch. DoE ref 1A/155 Grid Reference: .
The facade of No 20 Bridge Street, Christchurch. DoE ref 1A/161. Grid Reference: .
No 24 Bridge Street, Christchurch. DoE ref 1A/437. Grid Reference: .
No 38 Bridge Street, Christchurch. DoE ref   1A/167 Grid Reference: .
No 4 Bridge Street, Christchurch. DoE ref 1A/157 Grid Reference: .
No 40 Bridge Street, Christchurch. DoE ref 1A/168 Grid Reference: .
No 40a Bridge Street, Christchurch. DoE ref 1A/438 Grid Reference: .
No 48 Bridge Street, Christchurch. DoE ref 2/173 Grid Reference: .
No 50 Bridge Street, Christchurch. DoE ref 2/174 Grid Reference: .
Nos 12 & 14 Bridge Street, Christchurch. DoE ref 1A/159 Grid Reference: .
Nos 32 & 34 Bridge Street, Christchurch. DoE ref 1A/30 Grid Reference: .
Nos 6 & 8 Bridge Street, Christchurch. DoE ref 1A/ 158 Grid Reference: .
No 1 Bridge Street, Christchurch. DoE ref 1A/166 Grid Reference: 
No 23 Bridge Street, Christchurch. DoE ref 1A/164 Grid Reference: .
Nos 5 & 7 Bridge Street, Christchurch. DoE ref 1A/165 Grid Reference: .
The gates and piers at Bure Homage Lodge, Bure Lane, Mudeford. DoE ref 3/241 Grid Reference: .
Bure Homage Lodge, Bure Lane, Mudeford. DoE ref 3/240 Grid Reference: .
Brook Cottage, Burley Road, North Bockhampton. DoE ref 9/387 Grid Reference: .
Crumble Cottage, No 40 Burley Road, North Bockhampton. DoE ref 9/389 Grid Reference: .
Wings, Burley Road, Winkton. DoE ref 9/386 Grid Reference: .
The Thatched Cottage, (North side) Burley Road, Winkton. DoE ref 9/385 Grid Reference: .
Marigold Cottage, Burley Road, North Bockhampton. DoE ref 9/390 Grid Reference: .
No 5 Burley Road, Winkton. DoE ref 9/378 Grid Reference: .
The White Cottage, No 7 Burley Road, Winkton. DoE ref 9/380 Grid Reference: .
Peppercorn Cottage, Burton Road, Somerford. DoE ref 6/276 Grid Reference: .
No 12 Castle Street, Christchurch. DoE ref 1A/101 Grid Reference: .
No 18 Castle Street, Christchurch. DoE ref 1A/25 Grid Reference: .
No 20 Castle Street, Christchurch. DoE ref 1A/153 Grid Reference: 
The railings at Quartley's, No22 Castle Street, Christchurch. DoE ref 1A/154 Grid Reference: .
Nos 14 & 16 Castle Street, Christchurch. DoE ref 1A/100 Grid Reference: .
Nos 2 & 4 Castle Street, Christchurch. DoE ref 1A/110 Grid Reference: .
Nos 6 & 6a Castle Street, Christchurch. DoE ref 1A/111 Grid Reference: .
No 1 Castle Street, Christchurch. DoE ref 1A/23 Grid Reference: .
No 3 Castle Street, Christchurch. DoE ref 1A/117 Grid Reference: .
No 5 Castle Street, Christchurch. DoE ref 1A/116 Grid Reference: .
No 7 Castle Street, Christchurch. DoE ref 1A/115 Grid Reference: .
No 9 Castle Street, Christchurch. DoE ref 1A/114 Grid Reference: .
Signboard of King's Arms Hotel, Castle Street, Christchurch. DoE ref 1A/113 Grid Reference: .
Yew Cottage, No 29 Chewton Common Road, Chewton Common, Highcliffe. DoE ref 14/442 Grid Reference: .
Heath Cottage, No 33 Chewton Common Road, Chewton Common, Highcliffe. DoE ref 13/416 Grid Reference: .
Little Megs, No 35 Chewton Common Road, Chewton Common, Highcliffe. DoE ref 13/418 Grid Reference: .
No 35a Chewton Common Road, Chewton Common, Highcliffe. DoE ref 13/419 Grid Reference: .
Little Thatch, No 39 Chewton Common Road, Chewton Common, Highcliffe. DoE ref 14/424 Grid Reference: .
The Cottage, No 45 Chewton Common Road, Chewton Common, Highcliffe. DoE ref 14/425 Grid Reference: .
No 1 Church Lane, Christchurch. DoE ref 1A/133 Grid Reference: .
Candlemas Cottage, No 12 Church Lane, Christchurch. Haunted. Two reports of reflections of fire being seen in windows of back upstairs room. Two reports of reflections of fire being seen in windows of back upstairs room. DoE ref 1A/127 Grid Reference: .
No 9 Church Lane, Christchurch. DoE ref 1A/130 Grid Reference: .
Nos 10 & 11 Church Lane, Christchurch. DoE ref 1A/129 Grid Reference: .
Nos 2 & 3 Church Lane, Christchurch. DoE ref 1A/131 Grid Reference: .
Nos 4, 6, 7 and 8 Church Lane, Christchurch. DoE ref 1A1/10 Grid Reference: .
No 1 Church Street, Christchurch. DoE ref 1A/118 Grid Reference: .
No 10 Church Street, Christchurch. DoE ref 1A/121 Grid Reference: .
No 11 Church Street, Christchurch. DoE ref 1A/122 Grid Reference: .
No 12 Church Street, Christchurch. DoE ref 1A/6 Grid Reference: .
No 2 Church Street, Christchurch. DoE ref 1A/119 Grid Reference: .
No 3 & 3a Church Street, Christchurch. DoE ref 1A/120 Grid Reference: .
Nos 14 & 16 (including wall lamp) Church Street, Christchurch. DoE ref 1A/8 Grid Reference: .
Christchurch trolleybus turntable, Church Street, Christchurch. DoE ref 1A/128 Grid Reference: .
Boundary wall to the Garden of Remembrance, Church Street, Christchurch. DoE ref 1A/149 Grid Reference: .
Boundary Walls to Priory Gardens, Church Street, Christchurch. DoE ref 1A/151 Grid Reference: .
Sundial in Priory Churchyard, Priory Grounds, Christchurch. DoE ref 1A/150 Grid Reference: 
The Priory Ruins Priory Grounds, Christchurch. DoE ref 1A/147 Grid Reference: .
Nos 3 to 7 Cranemoor Avenue, Highcliffe. DoE ref 8/348 Grid Reference: .
Former farm house at Dudmoor Farm, Dudmoor Farm Road, Christchurch. DoE ref 9/384 Grid Reference: .
Milestone, Fairmile Road, DoE ref 4/248 Grid Reference: .
Dales House, Dales Lane, Hurn. DoE ref 8/348 Grid Reference: .
Holywell Cottage, Footners Lane, Burton. DoE ref 6/315 Grid Reference: .
Boundary wall at the entrance to No 7, Footners Lane, Burton. DoE ref 6/312 Grid Reference: .
No 17 Footners Lane, Burton. DoE ref 6/313 Grid Reference: .
Boundary wall at No 17, Footners Lane, Burton. DoE ref 6/314 Grid Reference: .
Tally Ho, Hawthorn Road, South Bockhampton. DoE ref 9/394 Grid Reference: .
Nos 42 & 44, High Street, Christchurch. DoE ref 1A/92 Grid Reference: .
Nos 72 & 74, High Street, Christchurch. DoE ref 1A/88 Grid Reference: .
Nos 76 & 76a, High Street, Christchurch. DoE ref 1A/87 Grid Reference: .
The Bow House, No 11 High Street, Christchurch. DoE ref 1A/3 Grid Reference: .
The Old Masonic Lodge, walls and railings. No 27 High Street, Christchurch. DoE ref 1A/2 Grid Reference: .
No 29 High Street, Christchurch. DoE ref 1A/1 Grid Reference: .
No 43 High Street, Christchurch. DoE ref 1A/81 Grid Reference: .
Nos 55, 55a and 55b High Street, Christchurch. DoE ref 1A/65 Grid Reference: .
The Nat West, 57, 57a and 57b High Street, Christchurch. DoE ref 1A/83 Grid Reference: .
Nos 59 & 61, High Street, Christchurch. DoE ref 1A/84 Grid Reference: .
Nos 63, 63a, 65 and 65a High Street, Christchurch. DoE ref 1A/85 Grid Reference: .
The rear garden wall at No 29, High Street, Christchurch. DoE ref 1A/79 Grid Reference: .
Walls in Druitt Gardens, High Street, Christchurch. DoE ref 1A/78 Grid Reference: .
Milestone at junction with Hoburne Lane, Highcliffe Road, Hoburne. DoE ref 6/439 Grid Reference: .
The Ice House at Hurn Court (formerly Heron Court), Hurn Court Lane, Hurn. DoE ref 8/349 Grid Reference: .
The Stable Block at Hurn Court, Hurn Court Lane, Hurn. DoE ref 8/352 Grid Reference: .
The courtyard walls at Hurn Court, Hurn Court Lane, Hurn. DoE ref 8/351 Grid Reference: .
The enclosed garden walls at Hurn Court, Hurn Court Lane, Hurn. DoE ref 8/353 Grid Reference: .
Nos 1 & 2 Blackwater, Hurn Road, Hurn. DoE ref 8/354 Grid Reference: .
No 4 Blackwater, Hurn Road, Hurn. DoE ref 8/355 Grid Reference: .
No 5 Blackwater Hurn Road, Hurn. DoE ref 8/356 Grid Reference: .
Nos 6 to 8 Blackwater, Hurn Road, Hurn. DoE ref 8/357 Grid Reference: .
The boundary wall to the cemetery, Jumpers Road, Christchurch. DoE Ref 4/242 Grid Reference: .
The Lodge, Jumpers Cemetery, Jumpers Road, Christchurch. DoE Ref 4/224 Grid Reference: .
The Twin Chapels, Jumpers Cemetery, Jumpers Road, Christchurch. DoE Ref 4/243 Grid Reference: .
Latch Farmhouse, Knapp Mill Avenue, Christchurch. DoE Ref 4/247 Grid Reference: .
The lychgate at the Parish Church of St. Marks, Lymington Road, Highcliffe. DoE Ref 13/42 Grid Reference: .
The milestone at the junction of Chewton Farm Road, Lymington Road, Highcliffe. DoE Ref 7/325 Grid Reference: .
The milestone at the end of the drive to St. Marks, Lymington Road, Highcliffe. DoE Ref 13/414 Grid Reference: .
St. Marks CoE Primary School, 245 & 246 Lymington Road, Highcliffe. DoE Ref 13/410 Grid Reference: .
Parish Church of St. Marks, Lymington Road, Highcliffe. DoE Ref 13/415 Grid Reference: .
The war memorial in the churchyard of St. Marks, Lymington Road, Highcliffe. DoE Ref 13/413 Grid Reference: .
The former boundary wall of Highcliffe Castle, Lymington Road, Highcliffe. DoE Ref 748/13/407 Grid Reference: .
The former lodge to Highcliffe Castle, No 179 Lymington Road, Highcliffe. DoE Ref 13/408 Grid Reference: .
No 181, gate post and railings, Lymington Road, Highcliffe. DoE Ref 13/409 Grid Reference: .
Chewton Bridge, Lymington Road, Highcliffe. DoE Ref 748/13/100 Grid Reference: .
The Rest, Marsh Lane, Christchurch. DoE Ref 5/264 Grid Reference: .
The White House, Marsh Lane, Christchurch. DoE Ref 5/263 Grid Reference: .
Lark Cottage, Martins Hill Lane, Burton. DoE Ref 6/308 Grid Reference: .
The Thatch, Martins Hill Lane, Burton. DoE Ref 6/306 Grid Reference: .
Wooland, Martins Hill Lane, Burton. DoE Ref 6/307 Grid Reference: .
West Quartleys, Martins Hill Lane, Burton. DoE Ref 6/309 Grid Reference: .
Barn at Merritown Farmhouse, Merritown Lane, Hurn. Grid DoE Ref 8/346 Grid Reference: .
Merritown Farmhouse, Merritown Lane, Hurn. DoE Ref 8/347 Grid Reference: .
Mill House, Mill Lane, Hurn. DoE Ref 7/53 Grid Reference: .
Nos 32 to 38 Millhams Street, Christchurch. DoE Ref 1A/102 Grid Reference: .
Nos 4 & 5 Millhams Street, Christchurch. DoE Ref 1A/22 Grid Reference: .
The Cottage, Millhams Street, Christchurch. DoE Ref 1A/60 Grid Reference: .
The Old Malthouse, Millhams Street, Christchurch. DoE Ref 1A/61 Grid Reference: .
The Olde Barne, Millhams Street, Christchurch. DoE Ref 1A/109 Grid Reference: .
Both graveyards of the URC Church, either side of Millhams Street, Christchurch. DoE Ref 1A/57 Grid Reference: .
The URC Church and attached Sunday School buildings, Millhams Street, Christchurch. DoE Ref 1A/56 Grid Reference: .
Church of All Saints, Mudeford. DoE Ref 3/239 Grid Reference: .
The Granary at Mudeford Farm, Mudeford. DoE Ref 3/238 Grid Reference: .
The Avonmouth Hotel, Mudeford. DoE Ref 3/39 Grid Reference: .
Dunkinty House, Mudeford. DoE Ref 2/55 Grid Reference: .
The gate piers and boundary walls to Sandhills, Mudeford. DoE Ref 3/231 Grid Reference: .
Mude Cottage, Mudeford. DoE Ref 2/210 Grid Reference: .
Mudeford House, Mudeford. DoE Ref 2/209 Grid Reference: .
Nelson's Cottage, Mudeford. DoE Ref 3/230 Grid Reference: .
The Staithe, Nos 117 to 119 Mudeford. DoE Ref 3/228 Grid Reference: .
Lawn Cottage, Mudeford. DoE Ref 3/229 Grid Reference: .
The Anchorage, No 157 Mudeford. Grid Reference:  DoE Ref 3/234
Cyprus Cottage, No 51 Mudeford. DoE Ref 2/206 Grid Reference: .
Jasmine Cottage and Lavender Cottage, Nos 53 and 55 Mudeford. DoE Ref 2/207 Grid Reference: .
Victoria Cottage, No 57 Mudeford. DoE Ref 2/37  Grid Reference: .
No 59 Mudeford. DoE Ref 2/208 Grid Reference: .
Pillar Box (Victorian), Mudeford. DoE Ref 3/226 Grid Reference: .
Scotts Cottage, Mudeford. DoE Ref 3/235 Grid Reference: .
Stratford Lodge, Mudeford. DoE Ref 3/223 Grid Reference: .
Street boundary wall at Scotts Cottage, Mudeford. DoE Ref 3/236 Grid Reference: .
Street boundary wall at The Anchorage, Mudeford. DoE Ref 3/223 Grid Reference: .
Willow Lodge, Mudeford. DoE Ref 2/54 Grid Reference: .
K6 telephone kiosk at the junction with Church Terraces, Mudeford Green, Mudeford. DoE Ref 3/242 Grid Reference: .
Parley Green Farmhouse, Parley Green Lane, Hurn. DoE Ref 12/403 Grid Reference: .
Barn at Parley Court, Parley Green Lane, Hurn. DoE Ref 12/405 Grid Reference: .
Thatched cottage and adjoining building, Parley Green Lane, Hurn. DoE Ref 12/406 Grid Reference: .
The granary at Hurn Bridge Farm, Parley Green Lane, Hurn. DoE Ref 8/341 Grid Reference: .
The chapel gatehouse, Parley Green Lane, Hurn. DoE Ref 8/345 Grid Reference: .
The farmhouse at Pithouse Lane, Sopley. DoE Ref 8/337 Grid Reference: .
Pithouse Cottage, Pithouse Lane, Sopley. DoE Ref 8/336 Grid Reference: .
The bridge Furnishing Factory, No 14 Purewell. DoE Ref 2/183 Grid Reference: .
The eastern boundary wall, No 34 Purewell. DoE Ref 2/185 Grid Reference: .
No 34 Purewell. DoE Ref 2/33 Grid Reference: .
No 8 Purewell. DoE Ref 2/180 Grid Reference: .
Purewell Farmhouse, Purewell. DoE Ref 2/36 Grid Reference: .
The war memorial at Purewell farm, Purewell. DoE Ref 2/199 Grid Reference: .
Rear boundary wall at No 35 Purewell. DoE Ref 2/195 Grid Reference: .
Rear boundary of Ashtree House, No 39 Purewell. DoE Ref 2/194 Grid Reference: .
The gate and piers at Ashtree House, No 39 Purewell. DoE Ref 2/193 Grid Reference: .
No 113 Purewell. DoE Ref 2/189 Grid Reference: .
No 35 Purewell. DoE Ref 2/34 Grid Reference: .
No 37 Purewell. DoE Ref 2/197 Grid Reference: .
Ashtree House, No 39 Purewell. DoE Ref 2/35 Grid Reference: .
Ye Olde Starre Inne, No 9 Purewell. DoE Ref 2/32 Grid Reference: .
Nos 11 and 13 Purewell. DoE Ref 2/198 Grid Reference: .
Street boundary, wall and gate, No 37 Purewell. DoE Ref 2/196 Grid Reference: .
The Salisbury Arms, Purewell. DoE Ref 2/192 Grid Reference: .
The Priory churchyard wall and gates along Quay Road, Christchurch. DoE Ref 1A/146 Grid Reference: .
The Priory churchyard wall between the churchyard and the vicarage. Christchurch. DoE Ref 1A/144 Grid Reference: .
Christchurch Vicarage, Quay Road, Christchurch. DoE Ref 1A/440 Grid Reference: .
Nos 1 and 2 Quay Road, Christchurch. DoE Ref 1A/143 Grid Reference: .
Vicarage garden wall along Church Street, Quay Road, Christchurch. DoE Ref 1A/126 Grid Reference: .
The art gallery and picture store (originally the stables) at the Red House Museum, Quay Road, Christchurch. DoE Ref 1A/142 Grid Reference: .
The bandstand on the Quomps, Quay Road, Christchurch. DoE Ref 1A/148 Grid Reference: 
The boundary wall to the Red House Museum, Quay Road, Christchurch. DoE Ref 1A/145 Grid Reference: 
Pillar box (Edward VIII) outside Walkford sub post office, DoE Ref 14/440 Grid Reference: 
No 144 Ringwood Road, Walkford, Highcliffe. DoE Ref 14/431 Grid Reference: .
Ivy Cottage, No 84 Ringwood Road, Walkford, Highcliffe. DoE Ref 14/429 Grid Reference: .
Cranemoor URC, No 142 Ringwood Road, Walkford, Highcliffe. DoE Ref 14/430 Grid Reference: .
The former Bosley farmhouse, 168 River Way, Christchurch. DoE Ref 8/334 Grid Reference: .
The Thatch, Roeshot Hill, Christchurch. DoE Ref 6/273 Grid Reference: .
The milestone outside the Roeshot public house, Roeshot Hill, Christchurch. DoE Ref 6/274 Grid Reference: .
No 61 Salisbury Road, Burton. DoE Ref 6/287 Grid Reference: .
Nos 110 to 114 Salisbury Road, Burton. DoE Ref 6/296 Grid Reference: .
Bumble Bee Cottage, Salisbury Road, Burton. DoE Ref 9/377 Grid Reference: .
Greenhayes, Salisbury Road, Burton. DoE Ref 9/376 Grid Reference: .
No 120 Salisbury Road, Burton. DoE Ref 6/300 Grid Reference: .
Nos 64 and 66 Salisbury Road, Burton. DoE Ref 6/295 Grid Reference: .
The Parish Church of St. Luke, Salisbury Road, Burton. DoE Ref 6/301 Grid Reference: .
The Sycamores, Salisbury Road, Burton. DoE Ref 6/302 Grid Reference: .
Clifton Cottage, Salisbury Road, Winkton. DoE Ref 9/375 Grid Reference: .
St. Annes Cottage and Kimbolton Cottage, Salisbury Road, Winkton. DoE Ref 9/374 Grid Reference: .
The barn at Waters farm, No 45 Salisbury Road, Burton. DoE Ref 6/286 Grid Reference: .
Burton Green URC, No 119 Salisbury Road, Burton. DoE Ref 6/291 Grid Reference: .
The farmhouse at Staplecross Farm. Salisbury Road, Burton. DoE Ref 6/279 Grid Reference: .
Gate piers and street boundary wall, Burton Hall, Salisbury Road, Burton. DoE Ref 9/365A Grid Reference: .
The granary at Burton Farm, Salisbury Road, Burton. DoE Ref 6/285 Grid Reference: .
The Manor Arms, Salisbury Road, Burton. DoE Ref 6/281 Grid Reference: .
The milestone on the west side of Salisbury Road, Burton. DoE Ref 9/371 Grid Reference: .
The milestone at Staplecross Farm, Salisbury Road, Burton. DoE Ref 6/278 Grid Reference: .
No 1 Salisbury Road, Burton. DoE Ref 6/277 Grid Reference: .
The Coach House, No 11 Salisbury Road, Burton. DoE Ref 6/280 Grid Reference: .
Brinsons Farm Farmhouse, No 125 Salisbury Road, Burton. DoE Ref 6/29 Grid Reference: .
No 143 Salisbury Road, Burton. DoE Ref 6/294 Grid Reference: 
Martins Hill Farmhouse, No 85 Salisbury Road, Burton. DoE Ref 6/288 Grid Reference: .
Ochiltree, Salisbury Road, Burton. DoE Ref 9/368 Grid Reference: .
Gosfield Cottage, Salisbury Road, Winkton. DoE Ref 9/366 Grid Reference: .
Monks Revel, Salisbury Road, Winkton. DoE Ref 9/365 Salisbury Road, Winkton. Grid Reference: .
No 105 (Whitehayes) and No 107 (Sunnyhayes) Salisbury Road, Burton. DoE Ref 6/290 Grid Reference: .
The Cedars, No 29 Salisbury Road, Burton. DoE Ref 6/283 Grid Reference: .
Nos 6 and 8 Scotts Hill Lane, Purewell. DoE Ref 6/275 Grid Reference: .
Nos 9 to 11 (consecutively) Silver Street, Christchurch. DoE Ref 1A/137 Grid Reference: .
No 56 Sopers Lane, Christchurch. DoE Reference: 1/45 Grid Reference: .
Nos 58 and 60 Sopers Lane, Christchurch. DoE Reference: 1/170 Grid Reference: .
No 69 Stanpit, Mudeford. DoE Reference: 2/214 Grid Reference: .
The boundary wall at No 69 Stanpit, Mudeford. 2/213 Grid Reference: .
Meath Cottage, No 168 Stony Lane, Burton. DoE Reference: 6/323 Grid Reference: .
No 70 (Hill View ) No 172 (Lilac Cottage) Stony Lane, Burton. DoE Reference: 6/324 Grid Reference: .
Yew Tree Cottage, No 163 Stony Lane, Burton. DoE Reference: 6/317 Grid Reference: .
Roselea Cottage, No 165 Stony Lane, Burton. DoE Reference: 6/318 Grid Reference: .
Cherry Tree Cottage, No 167 Stony Lane, Burton. DoE Reference: 6/319 Grid Reference: .
Rose Cottage, No 169 Stony Lane, Burton. DoE Reference: 6/320 Grid Reference: .
Avon Beck Cottage, No 173 Stony Lane, Burton. DoE Reference: 6/321 Grid Reference: .
Abbotswood, No 32 Stour Way, Christchurch. DoE Reference: 5/262 Grid Reference: .
The lodge to Greystones house, Waterford Road, Highcliffe. DoE Reference: 13/434 Grid Reference: .
No 3 Whitehall, Christchurch. DoE Reference: 1A/135 Grid Reference: .
Nos 2 and 4 Whitehall, Christchurch. DoE Reference: 1A/141 Grid Reference: .

References

External links 
Grade I listed buildings in Christchurch
Grade II and II* listed buildings in Christchurch
Locally listed buildings in Christchurch

Buildings and structures in Christchurch, Dorset
Christchurch
Christchurch